Sedgwick County is a county located in the U.S. state of Colorado. As of the 2020 census, the population was 2,404. The county seat is Julesburg. The county was named for Fort Sedgwick, a military post along the Platte Trail, which was named for General John Sedgwick. It is located near the state border with Nebraska.

History
Sedgwick County was named after John Sedgwick, who was a major general in the Union Army during the American Civil War.

Geography

Adjacent counties
Deuel County, Nebraska – north
Perkins County, Nebraska – east
Phillips County – south
Logan County – west
Cheyenne County, Nebraska – northwest

Major highways
  Interstate 76
  U.S. Highway 138
  U.S. Highway 385
  State Highway 11
  State Highway 23
  State Highway 59

Trails and byways
American Discovery Trail
First transcontinental railroad
Pony Express National Historic Trail
South Platte River Trail Scenic and Historic Byway
South Platte Trail
Upper Crossing of the California Trail

Demographics

At the 2000 census there were 2,747 people in 1,165 households, including 802 families, in the county.  The population density was 5 people per square mile (2/km2).  There were 1,387 housing units at an average density of 2 per square mile (1/km2).  The racial makeup of the county was 90.50% White, 0.51% Black or African American, 0.15% Native American, 0.76% Asian, 0.07% Pacific Islander, 5.97% from other races, and 2.04% from two or more races.  11.43% of the population were Hispanic or Latino of any race.
Of the 1,165 households 26.40% had children under the age of 18 living with them, 59.10% were married couples living together, 6.60% had a female householder with no husband present, and 31.10% were non-families. 29.40% of households were one person and 13.60% were one person aged 65 or older.  The average household size was 2.31 and the average family size was 2.83.

The age distribution was 22.80% under the age of 18, 6.60% from 18 to 24, 23.50% from 25 to 44, 25.00% from 45 to 64, and 22.10% 65 or older.  The median age was 43 years. For every 100 females there were 100.10 males.  For every 100 females age 18 and over, there were 97.20 males.

The median household income was $28,278 and the median family income  was $33,953. Males had a median income of $25,463 versus $16,392 for females. The per capita income for the county was $16,125.  About 7.80% of families and 10.00% of the population were below the poverty line, including 13.70% of those under age 18 and 4.20% of those age 65 or over.

Politics
Sedgwick County has been strongly Republican for most of its history. It was the only Colorado county to vote for Charles Evans Hughes in 1916 and one of only two carried by Theodore Roosevelt in 1912, while only three Democratic presidential candidates – William Jennings Bryan in the “free silver” 1896 election plus Franklin D. Roosevelt and Lyndon Johnson in the 1932, 1936 and 1964 landslide wins – have ever carried the county, which has voted for the same candidate as the state of South Dakota in every election since its formation.

Communities

Towns
Julesburg
Ovid
Sedgwick

See also

Outline of Colorado
Index of Colorado-related articles
National Register of Historic Places listings in Sedgwick County, Colorado

Notes

References

External links

Colorado County Evolution by Don Stanwyck
Colorado Historical Society

 

 
Colorado counties
1889 establishments in Colorado
Eastern Plains
Populated places established in 1889